James Carothers Garrison (born Earling Carothers Garrison; November 20, 1921 – October 21, 1992) was the District Attorney of Orleans Parish, Louisiana, from 1962 to 1973. A member of the Democratic Party, he is best known for his investigations into the assassination of President John F. Kennedy and prosecution of New Orleans businessman Clay Shaw to that effect in 1969, which ended in Shaw's acquittal. The author of three books, one became a prime source for Oliver Stone's film JFK in 1991, in which Garrison was portrayed by actor Kevin Costner, while Garrison himself also made a cameo as Earl Warren.

Early life and career 
Earling Carothers Garrison was born in Denison, Iowa, in 1921. He was the first child and only son of Earling R. Garrison and Jane Anne Robinson who divorced when he was two years old. His family moved to New Orleans in his childhood, where he was raised by his divorced mother. He served in the U.S. Army Air Forces during World War II, having joined the year before the Japanese attack on Pearl Harbor. After the war he obtained a law degree from Tulane University Law School in 1949. He then worked for the Federal Bureau of Investigation (FBI) for two years where he was stationed with the Seattle office. Leading up to the Korean War era, Garrison joined the National Guard, even applying for active duty with the Army in 1951, but because of recurring nightmares of past missions Garrison was then relieved of duty by the Army. Remaining in the Guard when it became apparent that he suffered from shell shock due to his numerous bombing missions flown during World War II, leading one Army doctor to conclude that Garrison had a "severe and disabling psychoneurosis" which "interfered with his social and professional adjustment to a marked degree. He was considered totally incapacitated from the standpoint of military duty and moderately incapacitated in civilian adaptability." Yet, when his record was reviewed further by the U.S. Army Surgeon General, he "found him to be physically qualified for federal recognition in the national army." Upon returning again to civilian life, Garrison worked in several different trial lawyer positions before winning election as New Orleans District Attorney, starting with his first of three terms in January 1962.

District attorney 
In the years prior to winning office as New Orleans District Attorney in 1961, Garrison worked for the New Orleans law firm of Deutsch, Kerrigan & Stiles from 1954 to 1958, before he first became an assistant district attorney. Garrison became a flamboyant, colorful, well-known figure in New Orleans but was initially unsuccessful in his run for public office.  He lost a 1959 election for criminal court judge. In 1961, he ran for district attorney and won against incumbent Richard Dowling by 6,000 votes in a five-man Democratic primary. Despite lack of major political backing, his performance in a television debate and last-minute television commercials facilitated his victory.

Once in office, Garrison cracked down on prostitution and the abuses of Bourbon Street bars and strip joints. He indicted Dowling and one of his assistants for criminal malfeasance, but the charges were dismissed for lack of evidence. Garrison did not appeal. Garrison received national attention for a series of vice raids in the French Quarter, staged sometimes on a nightly basis. Newspaper headlines in 1962 praised Garrison's efforts, "Quarter Crime Emergency Declared by Police, DA. – Garrison Back, Vows Vice Drive to Continue – 14 Arrested, 12 more nabbed in Vice Raids." Garrison's critics often point out that many of the arrests made by his office did not result in convictions, implying that he was in the habit of making arrests without evidence. However, assistant DA William Alford has said that charges would more often than not be reduced or dropped if a relative of someone charged gained Garrison's ear. Alford said Garrison had "a heart of gold."

After a conflict with local criminal judges over his budget, he accused them of racketeering and conspiring against him. The eight judges charged him with misdemeanor criminal defamation, and Garrison was convicted in January 1963. In 1964, the U.S. Supreme Court overturned the conviction and struck down the state statute as unconstitutional. At the same time, Garrison indicted Judge Bernard Cocke with criminal malfeasance and, in two trials prosecuted by Garrison himself, Cocke was acquitted.

Garrison charged nine policemen with brutality, but dropped the charges two weeks later. At a press conference, he accused the state parole board of accepting bribes, but could obtain no indictments. Critical of the state legislature, Garrison was unanimously censured by it for "deliberately maligning all of the members".

In 1965, running for reelection against Judge Malcolm O'Hara, Garrison won with 60 percent of the vote.

Kennedy assassination investigation 

As New Orleans D.A. in late 1966, Garrison began an investigation into the assassination of President John F. Kennedy, after receiving several tips from Jack Martin that a man named David Ferrie may have been involved in the assassination. The result of Garrison's investigation was the arrest and trial of New Orleans businessman Clay Shaw in 1969, with Shaw being unanimously acquitted less than one hour after the case went to the jury.

Garrison was able to subpoena the Zapruder film from Life magazine. Thus, members of the American public – i.e., the jurors of the case – were shown the movie for the first time. Until the trial, the film had rarely been seen, and bootleg copies were made by assassination investigator Steve Jaffe working with Garrison, which led to the film's wider distribution by David S. Lifton. In 2015, Garrison's lead investigator's daughter released his copy of the film, along with a number of his personal papers from the investigation.

Garrison's key witness against Shaw was Perry Russo, a 25-year-old insurance salesman from Baton Rouge, Louisiana. At the trial, Russo testified that he had attended a party at anti-Castro activist David Ferrie's apartment. At the party, Russo said that Lee Harvey Oswald (who Russo said was introduced to him as "Leon Oswald"), David Ferrie, and "Clem Bertrand" (who Russo identified in the courtroom as Clay Shaw) had discussed killing President Kennedy. The conversation included plans for the "triangulation of crossfire" and alibis for the participants.

Russo's version of events has been questioned by some historians and researchers, such as Patricia Lambert, once it became known that part of his testimony might have been induced by hypnotism, and by the drug sodium pentothal (sometimes called "truth serum"). An early version of Russo's testimony (as told in Assistant D.A. Andrew Sciambra's memo, before Russo was subjected to sodium pentothal and hypnosis) fails to mention an "assassination party" and says that Russo met Shaw on two occasions, neither of which occurred at the party. However, in his book On the Trail of the Assassins, Garrison says that Russo had already discussed the party at Ferrie's apartment before any "truth serum" was administered. Scambria said that the party information was simply accidentally left off the notes of his encounter with Russo. Throughout his life, Russo reiterated the same account of being present for a party at Ferrie's house along with the Mr. Bertrand where the subject of Kennedy's potential assassination had come up.

Garrison defended his conduct regarding witness testimony, stating:
Before we introduced the testimony of our witnesses, we made them undergo independent verifying tests, including polygraph examination, truth serum and hypnosis. We thought this would be hailed as an unprecedented step in jurisprudence; instead, the press turned around and hinted that we had drugged our witnesses or given them posthypnotic suggestions to testify falsely.

In January 1968, Garrison subpoenaed Kerry Wendell Thornley – an acquaintance of Oswald's from their days in the military – to appear before a grand jury, questioning him about his relationship with Oswald and his knowledge of other figures Garrison believed to be connected to the assassination. Thornley sought a cancellation of this subpoena on which he had to appear before the Circuit Court. Garrison charged Thornley with perjury after Thornley denied that he had been in contact with Oswald in any manner since 1959. The perjury charge was eventually dropped by Garrison's successor Harry Connick Sr.

During Garrison's 1973 bribery trial, tape recordings from March 1971 revealed that Garrison considered publicly implicating former United States Air Force General and Deputy Director of the Central Intelligence Agency Charles Cabell of conspiracy in the assassination of Kennedy after learning he was the brother of Earle Cabell, the Dallas mayor in 1963. Theorizing that a plot to kill the president was masterminded out of New Orleans in conjunction with the CIA with cooperation from the Dallas police department and city government, Garrison tasked his chief investigator, Pershing Gervais, of looking into the possibility that General Cabell had stayed in the city's Fontainebleau Motel at the time of the assassination. The Washington Post reported that there was no evidence that Gervais ever followed through with the request and that there was no further mention of General Cabell in Garrison's investigation.

US talk radio host David Mendelsohn conducted a comprehensive interview with Garrison which was broadcast in 1988 by KPFA in Berkeley, California. Alongside Garrison, the program featured the voices of Lee Harvey Oswald and JFK filmmaker Oliver Stone. Garrison explains that cover stories were circulated in an attempt to blame the killing on the Cubans and the Mafia but he blames the conspiracy to kill the president firmly on the CIA who wanted to continue the Cold War.

Later career and death 

In 1973, Garrison was tried and found not guilty by the jury for accepting bribes to protect illegal pinball machine operations. The prosecutor was Gerald J. Gallinghouse the United States Attorney for Eastern District of Louisiana, who was seeking to halt public corruption. Pershing Gervais, Garrison's former chief investigator, testified that Garrison had received approximately $3,000 every two months for nine years from the dealers. Acting as his own defense attorney, Garrison called the allegations baseless and claimed that they were concocted as part of a U.S. government effort to destroy him because of Garrison's efforts to implicate the CIA in the Kennedy assassination. The jury found Garrison not guilty. In an interview conducted by New Orleans reporter Rosemary James with Pershing Gervais, Gervais had admitted to concocting the charges.

In the same year, Garrison was defeated for reelection as district attorney by Harry Connick Sr. On April 15, 1978, Garrison won a special election over a Republican candidate, Thomas F. Jordan, for Louisiana's 4th Circuit Court of Appeal judgeship, a position for which he was later reelected and which he held until his death.

In 1987, Garrison played Judge Jim Garrison in the film The Big Easy, and was featured in The Men Who Killed Kennedy series, beginning in 1988.

After the Shaw trial, Garrison wrote three books on the Kennedy assassination, A Heritage of Stone (1970), The Star Spangled Contract (1976, fiction, but based on the JFK assassination), and his best-seller, On the Trail of the Assassins (1988). A Heritage of Stone, published by Putnam, places responsibility for the assassination on the CIA and says the Warren Commission, the Executive Branch, members of the Dallas Police Department, the pathologists at Bethesda, and various others lied to the American public. The book does not mention Shaw or Garrison's investigation of Shaw.

Garrison's investigation received widespread attention through Oliver Stone's film, JFK (1991), which was largely based on Garrison's book as well as Jim Marrs' Crossfire: The Plot That Killed Kennedy. Kevin Costner played a fictionalized version of Garrison in the movie. Garrison himself had a small on-screen role in the film, playing United States Supreme Court Chief Justice Earl Warren. Garrison also appears live and comments on the Shaw Trial in the documentary The JFK Assassination: The Jim Garrison Tapes, written and directed by actor John Barbour.

Garrison died of cancer in 1992, survived by his five children. He is interred at Metairie Cemetery in New Orleans.

Legacy 

Political analyst and conspiracy believer Carl Oglesby was quoted as saying, "... I have done a study of Garrison: I come out of it thinking that he is one of the really first-rate class-act heroes of this whole ugly story [the killing of John F. Kennedy and subsequent investigation]."

Garrison's investigation and trial of Shaw has been described by critics as "a fatally flawed case built on flimsy evidence that featured a chorus of dubious and even wacky witnesses." Political commentator George Will wrote that Garrison "staged an assassination 'investigation' that involved recklessness, cruelty, abuse of power, publicity mongering and dishonesty, all on a scale that strongly suggested lunacy leavened by cynicism." Former Harry Connick Sr. Orleans Parish district attorney said it was "a travesty of justice" and that he "thought it was one of the grossest, most extreme miscarriages of justice in the annals of American judicial history." Journalist Max Holland also described the investigation of Shaw as an "egregious miscarriage of justice". Others who have called Garrison's case against Shaw a "miscarriage of justice" or "travesty of justice" include historian Alecia Long and journalist Gerald Posner. Conspiracy researcher Harold Weisberg called it a "tragedy".

Conspiracy author David Lifton called Garrison "intellectually dishonest, a reckless prosecutor, and a total charlatan". At the time, Garrison came under criticism from author and researcher Sylvia Meagher, who in 1967 wrote:

... as the Garrison investigation continued to unfold, it gave cause for increasingly serious misgivings about the validity of his evidence, the credibility of his witnesses, and the scrupulousness of his methods.

According to Shaw's defense team, witnesses, including Russo, claimed to have been bribed and threatened with perjury and contempt of court charges by Garrison in order to make his case against Shaw.

Filmography

Selected bibliography

Books 
 A Heritage of Stone. Putnam Publishing Group (1970) .
 The Star Spangled Contract. New York: McGraw-Hill (1976). . .
 On the Trail of the Assassins. Grand Central Publishing (1981). .

Articles 
 "The Murder Talents of the CIA". Freedom (April/May 1987)

References

Further reading 
 Milton E. Brener, The Garrison Case: A Study in the Abuse of Power (Clarkson N. Potter, 1969)
 Vincent Bugliosi, Reclaiming History: The Assassination of President John F. Kennedy (W.W. Norton and Company, 2007) – pp. 1347–1436 of the main text and pp. 804–932 of the endnotes are devoted to "Jim Garrison's Prosecution of Clay Shaw and Oliver Stone's Movie JFK"
 William Hardy Davis, Aiming for the Jugular in New Orleans (Ashley Books, June 1976)
 Sean Egan, Ponies & Rainbows: The Life of James Kirkwood (Bearmanor Media, December 2011)
 Paris Flamonde, The Kennedy Conspiracy
 Paris Flamonde, The Assassinastion of America (2007)
 James Kirkwood, American Grotesque: An Account of the Clay Shaw-Jim Garrison-Kennedy Assassination Trial in New Orleans
 
 Mark Lane, Rush to Judgement (Thunder's Mouth Press, 2nd edition, March 1992) 
 Mark Lane, Last Word: My Indictment of the CIA in the Murder of JFK (Skyhorse Publishing, November 2011) 
 Gerald Posner, Case Closed: Lee Harvey Oswald and the Assassination of JFK (New York: Random House Publishers, 1993)
 
 
 Harold Weisberg, Oswald in New Orleans: Case for Conspiracy with the C.I.A. (New York: Canyon Books, 1967)
 Christine Wiltz, The Last Madam pp. 145–150 
 DiEugenio, James (1992). Destiny Betrayed: JFK, Cuba, and the Garrison Case. New York: Sheridan Square Press. .
 Davy, William (1999). Let Justice Be Done: New Light on the Jim Garrison Investigation. Reston, VA: Jordan Pub. .
 Joan Mellen (2005-10-19). A Farewell to Justice: Jim Garrison, JFK's assassination, and the case that should have changed history. Potomac Books Inc. .

External links 

 Jim Garrison's Reply to NBC News, July 15, 1967
 JFK Online: The Jim Garrison Investigation
 JFK Online: Jim Garrison audio resources – mp3s of Garrison speaking
 
 Jim Garrison Interview, Playboy magazine, Eric Norden, October 1967 
 

1921 births
1992 deaths
20th-century American lawyers
20th-century American non-fiction writers
20th-century American writers
American conspiracy theorists
Burials at Metairie Cemetery
Deaths from cancer in Louisiana
District attorneys in Louisiana
John F. Kennedy conspiracy theorists
Lawyers from New Orleans
Louisiana Democrats
Louisiana state court judges
Military personnel from Iowa
People from Denison, Iowa
People associated with the assassination of John F. Kennedy
Politicians from New Orleans
Researchers of the assassination of John F. Kennedy
Tulane University alumni
Tulane University Law School alumni
United States Army Air Forces personnel of World War II